The 2016 Louisiana–Lafayette Ragin' Cajuns baseball team represented the University of Louisiana at Lafayette in the 2016 NCAA Division I baseball season. The Ragin' Cajuns played their home games at M. L. Tigue Moore Field and were led by twenty-second year head coach Tony Robichaux.

Preseason

Sun Belt Conference Coaches Poll
The Sun Belt Conference Coaches Poll was released on February 2, 2016. Louisiana-Lafayette was picked to finish first in the Sun Belt with 117 votes and 8 first-place votes.

Preseason All-Sun Belt team

Evan Challenger (GASO, R-JR, Pitcher)
Gunner Leger (ULL, SO, Pitcher)
Kevin Hill (USA, R-SR, Pitcher)
Dylan Moore (ULL, SO, Pitcher)
Joey Roach (GSU, SR, Catcher)
Tanner Hill (TXST, SR, 1st Base)
Stefan Trosclair (ULL, SR, 2nd Base)
Justin Jones (GSU, SO, Shortstop)
Tanner Ring (ARST, SR, 3rd Base)
Ryan Blanton (GSU, JR, Outfield)
Kyle Clement (ULL, SR, Outfield)
Cole Billingsley (USA, R-JR, Outfield)
Danny Martinez (USA, SR, Designated Hitter)
Cory Geisler (TXST, SR, Utility)

Roster

Coaching staff

Schedule and results
Louisiana–Lafayette announced its 2016 baseball schedule on September 15, 2015. The 2016 schedule consisted of 28 home and 28 away games in the regular season, including a trip to Houston to play in one of the toughest college baseball series, the Houston College Classic. The Ragin' Cajuns will host Sun Belts foes Little Rock, Georgia State, Texas State, Appalachian State, and Louisiana-Monroe and will travel to Troy, Arkansas State, Georgia State, UT Arlington, and South Alabama.

The 2016 Sun Belt Conference Championship was contested on May 25–29 in San Marcos, Texas, and was hosted by Texas State University.

Lafayette Regional

References

Louisiana-Lafayette
Louisiana Ragin' Cajuns baseball seasons
Louisiana-Lafayette baseball
2016 NCAA Division I baseball tournament participants
Sun Belt Conference baseball champion seasons